William Kendall Fuller (November 24, 1792 – November 11, 1883) was an American lawyer and politician who served two terms as a U.S. Representative from New York from 1833 to 1837.

Biography 
Born in Schenectady, New York, Fuller attended the common schools, and graduated from Union College in 1810.
He studied law.
He was admitted to the bar in 1814 and commenced practice in Schenectady.

He served as adjutant general of New York in 1823.
He served as district attorney of Madison County 1821–1829.
He served as member of the State assembly in 1829 and 1830.

Congress 
Fuller was elected as a Jacksonian to the Twenty-third and Twenty-fourth Congresses (March 4, 1833 – March 3, 1837).

Later career and death 
He resumed the practice of law.

He died in Schenectady, New York, on November 11, 1883.
He was interred in Vale Cemetery.

References

1792 births
1883 deaths
Union College (New York) alumni
Jacksonian members of the United States House of Representatives from New York (state)
19th-century American politicians
Members of the United States House of Representatives from New York (state)